Cherry Log is a census-designated place and unincorporated community in Gilmer County, Georgia, United States. Its population was 99 as of the 2020 census. Cherry Log has a post office with ZIP code 30522. U.S. Route 76 passes through the community. Through the heart of Cherry Log runs Cherry Log Street, on which is found the Post Office, Cornerstone Baptist Church, Cherry Log Christian Church, and the Pink Pig, a restaurant in operation since 1950.

"Cherry Log" is the English translation of the former Cherokee village which once stood at the present town site.

In 2016, the  opened in Cherry Log.

Demographics

References

Unincorporated communities in Gilmer County, Georgia
Census-designated places in Georgia (U.S. state)